Nayantara (1950 – 30 November 2014) was an Indian actress. She worked in Marathi films, television and theatre. She is better known as Leelabai Kalbhor in Ashi Hi Banwa Banwi (1988).

Filmography

Films
 Aai Pahije (1988)
 Khiladi 420 (2000)
 Jigar (1998)
 Ashi hi Banava banavi  (1988)
 Bala Gau Kashi Angai (1977)
 Sagalikade Bombabomb (1988)
 Karti Premat Padali [Stage Drama]
 Shantech Kart Chalu Aahe [Stage Drama]
 Smart Vadhu Pahije [Stage Drama]
 Ithe Bhetalat Tar Bhetalat [Stage Drama]
 Mulga Maza Baijrao [Stage Drama]
 Kharyachi Duniya [Stage Drama]
 Caption Yenar Aahe [Stage Drama]
 Gilli Danda

See also
Marathi cinema

References 

1950 births
2014 deaths
Marathi actors
Actresses in Marathi cinema
Actresses from Mumbai
20th-century Indian actresses
Indian film actresses
Indian stage actresses